Kentucky Route 358 (KY 358) is a  state highway in the U.S. state of Kentucky. The highway connects mostly rural areas of Ballard and McCracken counties with LaCenter.

Route description

Ballard County
KY 358 begins at an intersection with KY 286 (Wickliffe Road) east-northeast of New York, within Ballard County, where the roadway continues as Flournoy Road. It travels to the north and travels through Hinkleville. The highway curves to the west. After it curves to the west-northwest and crosses over Little Humphrey Creek, it enters LaCenter. It curves to the north-northwest has a one-block concurrency with US 60 (West Kentucky Drive) to the east-northeast. When KY 358 splits off, it resumes its north-northwesterly direction. It passes a U.S. Post Office before it leaves the city limits of LaCenter. It crosses over Humphrey Slough and curves to the north-northeast. It crosses over Humphrey Creek and curves to the northeast. After it intersects KY 310 (Dennis Jones Road / Turner Landing Road), it begins a gradual curve to the north-northeast. KY 358 enters Bandana, where it has a very brief concurrency with KY 473 (Woodville Road / Oscar Road). It continues to the north-northeast and intersects KY 1782 (Monkey Eyebrow Road / Bandana Road). At this intersection, the highway turns right, to the east-southeast and enters McCracken County.

McCracken County
KY 358 travels through Ragland and then intersects the northern terminus of KY 1563 (Ingleside Road). It crosses over Newtons Creek and then intersects the northern terminus of KY 1564 (Joppa Landing Road). The highway crosses over Nasty Creek and intersects the northern terminus of KY 725 (New Liberty Church Road). It curves to a nearly due east direction and intersects the northern terminus of KY 1321 (Rossington Road). It then travels through Rossington and begins to curve to the southeast before it crosses over Bayou Creek. It passes Martin Cemetery and enters the West Kentucky Wildlife Management Area. When it crosses over Little Bayou Creek, it leaves the WMA. The highway has a very brief concurrency with KY 996 (Metropolis Lake Road) to the south-southwest. They split in Grahamville. KY 358 resumes its east-southeast trek and intersects the northern terminus of KY 724 (Bradford Road). The highway passes Palestine Cemetery and travels under a railroad bridge that carries some railroad tracks of Illinois Central Railroad. It travels through Palestine and intersects the northern terminus of KY 1565 (Mayfield–Metropolis Road). The highway crosses over Massac Creek before it intersects KY 2411 (Cold Springs Road). Almost immediately, it meets its eastern terminus, an intersection with KY 305 (Old Cairo Road).

Major intersections

See also

References

0358
Transportation in Ballard County, Kentucky
Transportation in McCracken County, Kentucky